Governor Bryant may refer to:

C. Farris Bryant (1914–2002), 34th Governor of Florida
Phil Bryant (born 1954), 64th Governor of Mississippi

See also
Governor Bryan (disambiguation)